E-ZPass is an electronic toll collection system used on toll roads, toll bridges, and toll tunnels in the Eastern United States, Midwestern United States, and Southern United States. The E-ZPass Interagency Group (IAG) consists of member agencies in several states, which use the same technology and allow travelers to use the same transponder on toll roads throughout the network. 

Since its creation in 1987, various independent systems that use the same technology have been folded into the E-ZPass system, including the I-PASS in Illinois and the NC Quick Pass in North Carolina. Negotiations are ongoing for nationwide interoperability in the United States.

Functionality

Technology

E-ZPass tags are active RFID transponders, historically made by Kapsch TrafficCom (formerly Mark IV Industries Corp—IVHS Division) under a competitively bid contract. They communicate with reader equipment built into lane-based or open-road toll collection lanes by transmitting a unique radio signature. The most common type of tag is an internal tag that can be mounted on the inside of the vehicle's windshield in proximity to the rear-view mirror. Though toll agencies advise adherence to the windshield with mounting strips (usually 3M's Scotch brand "Dual Lock" fasteners), third-party options using trays with suction cups to adhere a pass to a windshield temporarily if used in multiple vehicles are available. Some vehicles have windshields that block RF signals; for those vehicles, historical vehicles, and customers who have aesthetic concerns, an external tag is offered, typically designed to attach to the vehicle's front license plate mounting points.

Although a tag can be used with a motorcycle, usually no official instructions are given for mounting, due to the numerous variations between bike designs and the small area of a motorcycle windshield which could prove a hindrance if the transponder is attached following automobile instructions. Transponders may be put in a shirt or jacket pocket, if necessary.

The E-ZPass transponder works by listening for a signal broadcast by the reader stationed at the toll booth. This 915 MHz signal is sent at 500 kbit/s using the TDM (formerly IAG) protocol in 256-bit packets. Transponders use active Type II read/write technology. In April 2013, Kapsch (purchasers of Mark IV Industries) made the protocol available to all interested parties royalty-free in perpetuity and is granting the right to sublicense the protocol.

Payment and tag types
In some areas, however (typically recently built or retrofitted facilities), there is no need to slow down, because E-ZPass users can utilize dedicated traffic lanes ("Express E-ZPass" or "open road tolling") that are physically separate from the toll-booth lanes. Examples include: 

Other roads in the E-ZPass system have eschewed toll booths altogether, and switched to all-electronic tolling. As vehicles pass at normal speed under toll collection gantries, tolls are collected either through the E-ZPass transponder or by billing the owner of the vehicle via automatic number-plate recognition. Examples include: 

Each E-ZPass tag is specifically programmed for a particular class of vehicle; while any valid working tag will be read and accepted in any E-ZPass toll lane, the wrong toll amount will be charged if the tag's programmed vehicle class does not match the vehicle. This will result in a violation and possible large fine assessed to the tag holder, especially if a lower-class (e.g., passenger car) tag is being used in a higher-class vehicle such as a bus or truck. In an attempt to avoid this, E-ZPass tags for commercial vehicles are blue in color, contrasting with the white tags assigned to standard passenger vehicles. The blue E-ZPass is also used in government employee vehicles. In New York, an orange E-ZPass tag is issued to emergency vehicles as well as to employees of the Metropolitan Transportation Authority, Port Authority of New York and New Jersey, and New York State Thruway Authority. New York also offers green-colored E-ZPass tags (and a 10% toll discount plan) to qualifying low-emission and zero-emission vehicles.

For purposes of interoperability, all agencies are connected to each other by a secure network (the "reciprocity network"). This network provides the means to exchange tag data and process toll transactions across the various agencies. Tag data is exchanged among the agencies on a nightly basis. This data can take up to 24 hours on the primary network the unit is issued by (e.g., the New York State Thruway or Illinois Tollway system), but may be delayed by as much as 72 hours on other networks.

Expiry
 this is a partial list of states that will expire an E-ZPass account for inactivity:

 New Hampshire: 24 months
 North Carolina: at 24 months they start charging a dollar a month and close the account when it runs out of money
 Virginia: 12 months

Retail availability
Some issuing agencies offer a packaged E-ZPass transponder preloaded with toll funds sold over-the-counter at a retail setting such as a supermarket or pharmacy service desk that is valid immediately. A portion of the balance is available instantly; customers can access the remaining balance when they register their transponders with the issuing E-ZPass agency within several days of first using their E-ZPass.

Usage
According to the Port Authority of New York and New Jersey, 83.4% of vehicles crossing its six bridges and tunnels used E-ZPass for toll payment during all of 2016. As of 2020, about 86% of vehicles along the Pennsylvania Turnpike use E-ZPass for payment of tolls.

History

Creation
The earliest test of what was then known as the Automatic Vehicle Identification (AVI) was conducted by the Triborough Bridge and Tunnel Authority and the Port Authority of New York and New Jersey. They tested AVI tags on Staten Island and utilized a paper voucher as a control which proved to be far less accurate than the tags. As a result of the test the two agencies agreed to convene a larger group of the regions toll authorities. Their initial idea was to develop independent systems that did not interfere with each other. TBTA suggested that there be a regionally cooperative system using a single tag. That became the basis for regional cooperation The tolling agencies of New York, New Jersey, and Pennsylvania, which constitute two-thirds of the United States' $3-billion-a-year toll industry, met at an IBTTA meeting at to create a compatible electronic-tolling technology that could be used on the toll roads and bridges of the three states, in an effort to reduce congestion on some of the busiest roadways and toll plazas in the U.S. 

In 1991, the Interagency Committee was created to develop, and involved the participation and cooperation of seven independent toll agencies: the Port Authority of New York and New Jersey, the New Jersey Turnpike Authority, the New Jersey Highway Authority (which, at the time, operated the Garden State Parkway), the Triborough Bridge and Tunnel Authority), the New York State Thruway Authority, the Pennsylvania Turnpike Commission, and the South Jersey Transportation Authority (operator of the Atlantic City Expressway). The E-ZPass trademark, however, belongs to the Port Authority of New York and New Jersey. The Port Authority has been aggressive at protecting its trademark, including forcing the Los Angeles County Metropolitan Transportation Authority to rename the "EZ Pass" regional transit pass to "EZ transit pass" to protect its rights.

The seven agencies started making plans to test two possible technologies for E-ZPass in 1992. The technologies would be installed along the Garden State Parkway and New York State Thruway. E-ZPass was first deployed on the Thruway at the Spring Valley toll plaza on August 3, 1993. Over the following three and a half years, the New York State Thruway Authority (NYSTA) installed electronic toll-collection equipment, in stages, along the Thruway. By December 1996, it was implemented at all of the Thruway's fixed-toll barriers, and by March 1998, E-ZPass was installed at all of the Thruway's mainline exits.

The Triborough Bridge and Tunnel Authority, which maintains all toll bridges and tunnels that begin and end in New York City, is the largest tolling agency by revenue in the United States ($1.9 billion in 2017).  It began its E-ZPass implementation in 1995 and completed it at all nine of its toll facilities by January 1997. E-ZPass was popular among motorists who frequently used TBTA crossings, and by August 1996, nearly 2,000 motorists per day were signing up for E-ZPass. The Port Authority of New York and New Jersey, which operates all bridges and tunnels between New York City and New Jersey, implemented E-ZPass at the George Washington Bridge in July 1997, and at the Holland Tunnel and Lincoln Tunnel in October 1997.

The Pennsylvania Turnpike planned to adopt E-ZPass by 1998; however, implementation of the system was postponed until December 2, 2000, when E-ZPass debuted on the turnpike between Harrisburg West and the Delaware River Bridge. By December 15, 2001, E-ZPass could be used on the entire length of the mainline Pennsylvania Turnpike. Commercial vehicles were allowed to use the system beginning on December 14, 2002, and the entire Turnpike system was taking E-ZPass by 2006.

On October 6, 1998, a U.S. patent for an automated toll collection system was issued to Fred Slavin and Randy J. Schafer.

Expansion
Meanwhile, various other agencies began work on similar electronic toll collecting facilities. This resulted in the emergence of other networks:
 The MassPass system used in Massachusetts, changed to the compatible Fast Lane in 1998 and rebranded E-ZPass in 2012
 The I-Pass system used in Illinois
 The I-Zoom system used in Indiana, rebranded E-ZPass in 2012
 The Smart Tag system used in Virginia, merged with E-ZPass in 2004
 The TransPass system used in Maine, since replaced by the E-ZPass system
 The M-Tag system used in Maryland, integrated into and rebranded E-ZPass in 2001
 The Quick Pass system used in North Carolina, partially integrated in 2013 and integrated into Florida's SunPass system
 The E-Pass system in Florida, partially integrated in 2018
 The SunPass system in Florida, partially integrated in 2021
 The MnPass system in Minnesota, rebranded into E-ZPass in August 2021

Originally, these systems were not interchangeable with E-ZPass. However, since most of them use the same technology (or have since converted over to a compatible technology), all of them have been incorporated into the E-ZPass network. Though several still retain their own brand name for their own facilities, users of those systems can use E-ZPass and vice versa. As a result, all E-ZPass holders can use their transponders in any of the states that offer it.

The E-ZPass system continues to expand. The Indiana Toll Road Concession Company upgraded its toll plazas to include E-ZPass functionality on the Indiana East–West Toll Road, while the Ohio Turnpike Commission has upgraded its toll plazas in October 2009 for the Ohio Turnpike (I-76, I-80, I-90). On December 16, 2008, Rhode Island joined the network by activating E-ZPass lanes in the state's only toll booth, at the Claiborne Pell Newport Bridge. The Kentucky Transportation Cabinet, which had a toll road system predating the E-ZPass system which was ended in 2006, announced at the end of July 2015 its entrance into the E-ZPass system as part of the financing for the Louisville-area Ohio River Bridges Project involving the new Abraham Lincoln (paired with the retrofitted Kennedy) and Lewis and Clark bridges. 

On November 9, 2017, the Central Florida Expressway Authority (CFX) announced that it was joining the E-ZPass group. CFX began accepting E-ZPass along its toll roads on September 1, 2018. On May 28, 2021, the Florida Turnpike Enterprise announced that its SunPass facilities would begin accepting E-ZPass. In addition, E-ZPass facilities began accepting SunPass Pro transponders (but not earlier SunPass transponders).

Canada
E-ZPass is generally not accepted in Canada but several exceptions exist. Until 2005, drivers crossing the Peace Bridge between Fort Erie, Ontario, and Buffalo, New York, paid a toll before crossing to Canada. Following upgrades to the border crossings in 2005, drivers instead pay a toll on the Canadian side of the Peace Bridge after clearing Canadian customs. This is the first E-ZPass toll gantry outside of the United States. The toll goes to the Buffalo and Fort Erie Public Bridge Authority, a bi-national agency responsible for maintaining the international bridge.

On August 11, 2014, E-ZPass began to be accepted at the Lewiston–Queenston Bridge, Rainbow Bridge, and Whirlpool Rapids Bridge. The toll for the Lewiston–Queenston Bridge is paid in Canada after clearing Canadian customs, whereas the toll is paid before leaving the United States at the other two bridges. The toll from these three bridges goes to the Niagara Falls Bridge Commission.

On June 27, 2019, E-ZPass began to be accepted at the Thousand Islands Bridge on both the US side and Canada side.

While these facilities take both U.S. and Canadian cash, E-ZPass is only billable in U.S. dollars.

Out-of-network systems
E-ZPass ETC transponders do not work on all toll roads in the United States. Currently, the E-ZPass electronic toll-collection system (as well as the other ETC systems that are part of the E-ZPass network) are not compatible with California's FasTrak, Kansas's K-TAG, Oklahoma's Pikepass, Texas's TxTag, Utah's Express Pass, Puerto Rico's AutoExpreso, and Cruise Card, or other ETC systems outside of E-ZPass operating regions. Under MAP-21, passed in 2012, all ETC facilities in the United States were supposed to have some form of interoperability by October 1, 2016; however, no funding was provided for this effort, nor were penalties established for failure to meet this deadline, and  this has yet to be accomplished.

In 2009, the Alliance for Toll Interoperability stated that it was exploring the option of using high-speed cameras to take photographs of the cars passing through non-E-ZPass lanes in other states. The Pennsylvania Turnpike Commission, which had been studying going towards all-electronic tolling in order to cut costs, implemented such a system for non-E-ZPass users in 2020 due to the on-going COVID-19 pandemic.

Variants

E-ZPass Plus
For E-ZPass subscribers who replenish their accounts with a major credit card, the Port Authority of New York and New Jersey offers an E-ZPass option to pay for parking at three Port Authority airports—John F. Kennedy, LaGuardia, and Newark Liberty—through a program known as E-ZPass Plus. This program is also available in New York at Albany International Airport in Albany; Syracuse Hancock International Airport in Syracuse; and the parking lots at the New York State Fair when the fair is in progress; as well as in Atlantic City, New Jersey, at Atlantic City International Airport, the New York Avenue Parking Garage, and the Atlantic City Surface Lot.

The parking payment is debited from the prepaid E-ZPass account if the parking fee is less than $20. If it is $20 or more, the amount is charged directly to the credit card used to replenish the E-ZPass account. The Port Authority reports that drivers save an average of 15 seconds by opting to pay for airport parking using E-ZPass.

Subscribers who replenish their E-ZPass accounts with cash or check cannot participate in this program. Additionally, this service is only available to customers of the DelDOT, Delaware River Joint Toll Bridge Commission, Delaware River and Bay Authority, in Delaware; of the New Hampshire DOT; in Maryland; in New Jersey and New York to customers of the PANYNJ, the New York MTA, or the NYS Thruway; and to customers of the Pennsylvania Turnpike Commission.

E-ZPass Flex

In late 2012, the I-495 HOT (high occupancy toll) lanes in Virginia introduced the concept of the E-ZPass Flex transponder. E-ZPass Flex transponders work similarly to regular transponders, but they allow the driver to switch between HOV and toll-paying modes. When a transponder is switched to HOV mode, it is read by the HOT lane's toll equipment, but no toll is charged. E-ZPass Flex also works like a standard E-ZPass on all other toll roads where E-ZPass is accepted, regardless of the position of the switch.

, E-ZPass Flex devices are currently issued only by Virginia, Maryland, Minnesota, and North Carolina The following toll roads support E-ZPass Flex in HOV mode:

 Minnesota
 All toll facilitates in the system are variable rate HOV lanes and use the Flex transponder. (Free for HOV 2+.)

 North Carolina
 I-77 Express Lanes (free for HOV 3+)

 Virginia
 I-495, I-395 and I-95 Express Lanes (free for HOV 3+)
 I-66 Express Lanes inside and outside the I-495 Beltway (free for HOV 3+)
 I-64 Express Lanes (free for HOV 2+)

Until April 2021, the Verrazzano-Narrows Bridge in New York supported E-ZPass Flex in HOV mode, with a reduced toll for HOV 3+. MTA Bridges and Tunnels only issued the transponders to Staten Island residents. The MTA only offers discounted tolls to holders of New York transponders, so holders of Virginia, Maryland, and North Carolina E-ZPass Flex devices had to pay the full toll regardless of their HOV status.

E-PASS uni
The Central Florida Expressway Authority offers E-PASS 'uni' (originally E-PASS Xtra), which is compatible with E-ZPass as well as E-PASS, SunPass, LeeWay, PeachPass, NC QuickPass, RiverLink, I-PASS, and FastPass toll systems. It works on E-ZPass toll roads as well as all toll roads in Florida and Georgia. It does not, however, offer the E-ZPass Flex functionality noted above.

SunPass Pro
The SunPass system in Florida offers the SunPass Pro, with the same toll road compatibility as the E-Pass uni.  It is meant for vehicles with 2 axles.  Vehicles with 3 or more axles that will travel outside of Florida are required to purchase a NC Quick Pass instead.

Effects

Reduced pollution and health improvement
A study published in the American Economic Journal: Applied Economics, "Traffic Congestion and Infant Health: Evidence from E-ZPass", compared fetal health outcomes for mothers living near congested and uncongested toll plazas on three major highways in Pennsylvania and New Jersey. The researchers focused on areas where toll plazas had instituted E-ZPass, which, because cars travel through more efficiently, diminishes congestion and pollution. The study drew its conclusions by looking at the health outcomes of nearly 30,000 births among mothers who lived within two kilometers of an E-ZPass toll plaza. The researchers state that their findings "suggest that the adoption of E-ZPass was associated with significant improvements of infant health." The study's specific findings were: 1) In areas where E-ZPass was adopted, rates of infant prematurity decreased by between 6.7% and 9.1%; this means that, out of the sample studied, 255 preterm births were likely avoided; 2) Introduction of E-ZPass was correlated with a reduction in the incidence of low birth weight by between 8.5% and 11.3%; that means 275 cases of low birth weight may have been avoided.

Increased home values and subsequent public opinion ramifications
Another study published in Research in Transportation Economics, "The impact of a transportation intervention on electoral politics: Evidence from E-ZPass", compared changes in home values in areas that switched from manual tolls to E-ZPass compared to similar areas that did not receive the E-ZPass intervention. Using a research design known as difference in differences, the researchers found that traffic indeed was reduced in E-ZPass areas compared to control areas (an average decrease of about 10% in daily commute times). As a consequence, areas near E-ZPasses become more attractive to homeowners, with an estimated resulting increase in home values of $50,185 compared to control areas. The authors then document a 2.37 percentage point decrease in Democratic vote share in the associated E-ZPass areas, which they argue with survey data was largely due to heightened concern around taxation in the areas experiencing the newfound property wealth.

Privacy concerns

Civil liberties and privacy rights advocates have expressed concern about how the position data gathered through E-ZPass is used. , several states that employ E-ZPass had provided electronic toll information in response to court orders in civil cases, including divorces and other non-criminal matters.

Position data is collected by antennas at locations in addition to fee collection locations. The New York State Department of Transportation (NYSDOT), for example, collect transponder information to provide real-time estimates of travel times between common destinations. By subtracting the time when vehicles pass under the first sign from the current time, the sign can display the expected travel time between the sign and the destination point ahead. This information is also used to determine the best times to schedule maintenance-related lane closures and for other traffic management purposes. According to NYSDOT, the individual tag information is encrypted, and is deleted as soon as the vehicle passes the last reader, and is never made available to the Department.

Accounts and agencies

Within the IAG, each member agency has its own billing and customer service center, and each establishes its own fee and discount structures. The agencies also set their own customer account policies. Areas of variation include the refundable deposit or nonrefundable charge for a tag, periodic maintenance fees, paper statement fees, the low account threshold, and replenishment amounts. E-ZPass is usually offered as a debit account: tolls are deducted from prepayments made by the users. Users may opt to have prepayments automatically deposited when their account is low, or they may submit prepayments manually, either by phone or a toll authority's web portal, depending on the agency. For commercial accounts, some agencies allow postpaid plans with a security deposit (which effectively renders them prepaid accounts, with a different replenishment policy).

Fees and discounts by state

Some agencies have imposed periodic account maintenance fees on their subscribers. After New Jersey began losing money with the E-ZPass system, a monthly account fee of one dollar was implemented on July 15, 2002 and is still in effect for both individual and business accounts. The Port Authority of New York and New Jersey also charges a monthly individual account fee of one dollar. On July 1, 2009, the Maryland Transportation Authority began charging a fee of $1.50 a month to account holders which, only applies to non-residents and is waived if three Maryland E-ZPass tolls were incurred during the previous month.

The Triborough Bridge and Tunnel Authority (TBTA) in New York City once imposed a monthly account fee starting on July 1, 2005, claiming to defray the administrative costs. However, New York State Assembly Bill A06859A in 2005 and 2006 and Senate Bill S6331 in 2006 both considered such a fee threatening the efficiency to move traffic faster with lower tolls and sought to ban it. When the New York State Law started to ban the monthly account fee, the TBTA repealed it on June 1, 2006, and those, especially New Jerseyans, seeking New York accounts and avoiding the monthly fee still imposed by New Jersey and Port Authority, would have to apply for the TBTA or the New York State Thruway accounts at an E-ZPass New York Service Center.

Several agencies offer discounted tolls to E-ZPass customers. The details vary widely, and can include general discounts for all E-ZPass users, variable pricing discounts for off-peak hours, commuter plans with minimum usage levels, flat rate plans offering unlimited use for a period of time, carpool plans for high-occupancy vehicles, and resident plans for those living near particular toll facilities. Many of these plans are available only to customers whose tags are issued by the agency that owns the toll facility in question (reciprocity applies to tag acceptance, not to discounts). Eight authorities in the Northeast (Maine, the Massachusetts Turnpike, the New Hampshire Turnpike, Rhode Island, the New York TBTA, the New York State Thruway, the New Jersey Turnpike, DelDOT and Maryland) restrict their general discounts to their own respective tagholders. The Delaware Memorial Bridge restricts its discount plans to New Jersey tags despite its toll plaza being located in Delaware (DelDOT-issued tags cannot obtain the discount plans).

Some agencies charge a one-time fee between $20 and $30 for each new transponder, including the Delaware Department of Transportation, the New Hampshire Department of Transportation, and the Maine Turnpike Authority. At least two agencies, the Delaware River and Bay Authority and the Maryland Transportation Authority, once charged multiple fees. In a press release dated July 17, 2007, the DRBA stated: "Beginning January 1, 2008, all DRBA E-ZPass account holders will be charged an account management fee of $1.50 per month. The transponder cost will also be passed on to E-ZPass customers for each new transponder." E-ZPass New York charges a monthly fee of 50 cents for each tag in connection with a business account. The DRBA since merged its service center with New Jersey's E-ZPass service center. On July 1, 2015, a plan put forth by Governor Larry Hogan eliminated Maryland's monthly fee (except accounts without a Maryland address, unless using Maryland toll facilities at least three times in the previous statement period) along with decreasing some toll rates especially for Maryland-issued E-ZPass tags.

E-ZPass users are not required to maintain their account with an agency in their home state (or if in a toll-free state, the closest one to them). Subscribers can open an E-ZPass account with any member of the IAG regardless of residency. This means that users have the option of choosing an agency based on the fees that it charges, effectively allowing them to circumvent transponder and account maintenance fees.

List of places where accepted

List of agencies

As listed on its website, the E-ZPass Interagency Group includes agencies in 19 states .
 Buffalo and Fort Erie Public Bridge Authority (New York/Ontario)
 Burlington County Bridge Commission (New Jersey/Pennsylvania)
 Cape May County Bridge Commission (New Jersey)
 Central Florida Expressway Authority
 Cline Avenue Bridge (Indiana)
 Delaware Department of Transportation
 Delaware River and Bay Authority (Delaware/New Jersey)
 Delaware River Joint Toll Bridge Commission (New Jersey/Pennsylvania)
 Delaware River Port Authority (New Jersey/Pennsylvania)
 Florida's Turnpike Enterprise
 Illinois State Toll Highway Authority
 Indiana Toll Road Concession Company
 Kane County Department of Transportation (Illinois)
 Kentucky Public Transportation Infrastructure Authority (see also Ohio River Bridges Project)
 Maine Turnpike Authority
 Maryland Transportation Authority
 Massachusetts Department of Transportation
 Metropolitan Transportation Authority Bridges and Tunnels (New York)
 Minnesota Department of Transportation
 New Hampshire Department of Transportation
 New Jersey Turnpike Authority
 New York State Bridge Authority
 New York State Thruway Authority
 Niagara Falls Bridge Commission (New York/Ontario)
 North Carolina Turnpike Authority
 Ohio Turnpike and Infrastructure Commission
 Pennsylvania Turnpike Commission
 Port Authority of New York and New Jersey (New Jersey/New York)
 Rhode Island Turnpike and Bridge Authority
 Skyway Concessions Company (Illinois)
 South Jersey Transportation Authority (New Jersey)
 Thousand Islands Bridge Authority (New York)
 Virginia Department of Transportation
 West Virginia Parkways Authority

Each of the E-ZPass states operates its own E-ZPass Service Center. NJ E-ZPass manages accounts for the Burlington County Bridge Commission, Delaware River and Bay Authority, Delaware River Joint Toll Bridge Commission and Delaware River Port Authority. The E-ZPass New York Service Center operates accounts for the Buffalo and Port Erie Public Bridge Authority, the Niagara Falls Bridge Commission, the Port Authority of New York and New Jersey, and the New York State Thruway Authority. The Virginia Department of Transportation is Virginia's sole member of the E-ZPass Interagency Group, but not all E-ZPass facilities in Virginia are operated by VDOT.

List of roadways, bridges, tunnels, and airports

The following tolled roads, bridges, tunnels, airports, and parking facilities accept E-ZPass. Crossings between jurisdictions are listed in the state where the toll collection point is located, or linked to (in the case of international border crossings).

Delaware
Delaware Memorial Bridge/Interstate 295 and U.S. Route 40
Delaware Turnpike/Interstate 95
Delaware Route 1
U.S. Route 301

Florida

From 2018 to 2021, E-ZPass was only available on the Central Florida Expressway Authority's 125-mile toll road network. Since 2021, the entire state of Florida has accepted E-ZPass.

Note: Does not work with older (2017 or earlier) E-ZPass transponders.

Illinois

Chicago Skyway/Interstate 90 (separate from I-Pass system)
Elgin-O'Hare Tollway/Illinois Route 390
Jane Addams Memorial Tollway/Interstate 39, Interstate 90, and U.S. Route 51
Ronald Reagan Memorial Tollway/Interstate 88
Chicago–Kansas City Expressway/Illinois Route 110
Tri-State Tollway/Interstate 80, Interstate 94, and Interstate 294
Veterans Memorial Tollway/Interstate 355

Indiana

Indiana Toll Road/Interstate 80, Interstate 90
 Lewis and Clark Bridge/Interstate 265 and Kentucky Route 841
Cline Avenue Bridge/Indiana State Route 912

Kentucky
 Lincoln & Kennedy Bridges/Interstate 65
 Lewis and Clark Bridge/Interstate 265 and Kentucky Route 841

Maine
Maine Turnpike/Interstate 95

Maryland
Baltimore Harbor Tunnel/Interstate 895
Fort McHenry Tunnel/Interstate 95
Francis Scott Key Bridge/Interstate 695
Maryland Route 200 (Intercounty Connector)
John F. Kennedy Memorial Highway/Interstate 95
William Preston Lane Jr. Memorial Bridge (aka the Chesapeake Bay Bridge)/U.S. Route 50 and U.S. Route 301
Governor Harry W. Nice Memorial Bridge/U.S. Route 301
Thomas J. Hatem Memorial Bridge/U.S. Route 40
Bicycling is conditionally allowed since 2016 subject to the same toll as a two-axle vehicle, payable with cash or E-ZPass.

Massachusetts

Callahan Tunnel/Massachusetts Route 1A
Massachusetts Turnpike/Interstate 90
Route 128 station parking garage
Sumner Tunnel/Massachusetts Route 1A
Ted Williams Tunnel/Interstate 90
Tobin Bridge/U.S. Route 1

Minnesota

Interstate 394/U.S. Route 12 (HOT lanes)
Interstate 35W (HOT lanes)
Interstate 35E (HOT lanes)

New Hampshire
Everett Turnpike/U.S. Route 3, Interstate 293, New Hampshire Route 3A, and Interstate 93
New Hampshire Turnpike (Blue Star Turnpike)/Interstate 95
Spaulding Turnpike/New Hampshire Route 16

New Jersey

New York

North Carolina

I-77 Express on Interstate 77 (HOT lanes)
Monroe Expressway/U.S. Route 74 Bypass
Triangle Expressway/North Carolina Highway 147 and North Carolina Highway 540

Ohio
Ohio Turnpike (sections of Interstate 76, Interstate 80, and Interstate 90)

Pennsylvania

Rhode Island
Pell Bridge/Rhode Island Route 138
Statewide truck-only tolling program

Virginia

West Virginia
West Virginia Turnpike/Interstate 64, Interstate 77

Parking
Although not part of the E-ZPass-Plus program, E-ZPass users may also pay for parking at Pittsburgh International Airport. The E-ZPass transponder is used for identification only. The Southern Beltway, which also uses E-ZPass, has its western terminus at the airport.

The New York State Fair offered E-ZPass Plus as a payment option at two of its parking lots for the first time in 2007, and offered the service again for subsequent seasons.  The service was administered by the New York State Thruway Authority (NYSTA), and motorists' E-ZPass accounts were charged the same $5 parking fee that cash customers were charged. Unlike other E-ZPass Plus implementations, the State Fair systems charged motorists at the parking lot entrances; drivers opting to pay by E-ZPass Plus used dedicated "E- ZPass Plus Only" lanes. Since the lots only charge for parking during the twelve days of the State Fair, mobile, self-contained E-ZPass units were used to process vehicles. The units were mounted on trailers with a collapsible gantry for the E-ZPass antennas, used a cellular wireless connection to send transactions to the NYSTA back-office system, and were powered by batteries that were kept replenished by photovoltaic solar panels, with a generator for backup. This service seems to be still existent (as the E-ZPass website lists the State Fair as part of its Plus program).

E-ZPass can be used to pay for parking at the Route 128 station in Westwood, Massachusetts; this is available for Massachusetts customers only. E-ZPass can also be used to pay for parking at John F. Kennedy International Airport and LaGuardia Airport in New York City as well as Newark Liberty International Airport.

Drive-thru retail
E-ZPass was tested in a since-discontinued program by some McDonald's restaurants on Long Island, New York, at which drive-through customers were given the option to pay using their E-ZPass accounts to test out cardless payment platforms. In late 2013, Wendy's started a similar system called drive-thru that is E-ZPass compatible, and it underwent testing at five Staten Island Wendy's locations.  In 2018, a one-year pilot project with the startup Verdeva was announced to test drive-thru and gas station payments via separate accounts set up with the E-ZPass system.

In December 2021, PayByCar launched a pilot program to accept E-ZPass (or its own RFID stickers) at 27 Alltown gas stations in the Boston area.

Non-transactional traffic monitoring
E-ZPass transponders are also used to monitor traffic. A transponder-reader is placed above the roadway at various intervals, and the time a particular tag takes between scans at each interval provides information about the speed of traffic between those points. This transit time information is often relayed back to motorists via electronic signs on the roadway or via traffic reporting agencies who use the information as part of radio and television traffic reports. The individual tag data is not collected or used for ticketing purposes, as some sources have suggested.

Toll facilities that do not accept E-ZPass in E-ZPass states and provinces
There are many toll facilities, mostly bridges run by independent authorities, that are not part of the E-ZPass network even though they are in a state that is in the E-ZPass region. With Congress seeking a national electronic toll-collection system in place by mid-2016 for federal highways, E-ZPass officials are talking to other states that have electronic tolls "to find a common way to do business". However, the congressional legislation did not include any penalties for agencies and states that failed to comply with the implementation of such a system. , most Florida and Minnesota toll facilities had become compatible with E-ZPass. Georgia toll roads were in the process of becoming compatible by 2022. Other states, like Texas, Oklahoma, Kansas, California, and Washington were not scheduled to become compatible with E-ZPass in the near future.

List of facilities
Anderson Ferry (Ohio/Kentucky)
Atlantic Beach Bridge (New York)
Augusta Ferry (Ohio/Kentucky)
Cape May–Lewes Ferry (Delaware/New Jersey)
Downbeach Express (New Jersey)
Dingman's Ferry Bridge (New Jersey/Pennsylvania)
Fort Frances–International Falls International Bridge (Minnesota/Ontario)
Fort Madison Toll Bridge (Illinois/Iowa)
Gasparilla Bridge (Florida)
Greenspring Low Water Toll Bridge (West Virginia/Maryland)
Hammock Dunes Bridge (Florida)
Memorial Bridge (West Virginia/Ohio)
Moseywood Road (Lake Harmony, Pennsylvania) – Toll paid upon entry to community. Provides a shortcut to Lake Harmony from Pennsylvania Route 940 to Pennsylvania Route 903
Newell Toll Bridge (West Virginia/Ohio) – Privately owned
Ogdensburg-Prescott International Bridge (New York/Ontario)
Seaway International Bridge (New York/Ontario)
St. Francisville Bridge – Old Wabash Cannonball Railroad (Illinois-Indiana)
Highway 407 (Ontario)

None of the toll bridges or tunnels partially in or fully in Michigan (Ambassador Bridge, privately-owned, along with the public Detroit-Windsor Tunnel, Blue Water Bridge, Mackinac Bridge, or International Bridge) use E-ZPass despite Michigan's adjacency to two states (Indiana and Ohio) that use it for their toll roads.

See also
 Drivewyze – weigh station bypassing of commercial vehicles at participating state highway locations
 List of electronic toll collection systems
 List of toll bridges
 List of toll roads
 NORPASS – weigh station bypassing, partner of E-ZPass
 PrePass – weigh station bypassing, commercial vehicles at participating state highway locations

References

External links

Official website
E-ZPass in Delaware
E-Zpass in Maine
E-ZPass in New Hampshire
E-ZPass in New Jersey
E-ZPass in New York
E-ZPass in Virginia

1987 introductions
Companies based in New Jersey
Electronic toll collection
Toll road authorities of the United States
Transportation in the United States